The 1914 Oregon Webfoots football team represented the University of Oregon in the 1914 college football season.

Schedule

References

Oregon
Oregon Ducks football seasons
Oregon Webfoots football